98.3 Energy FM (DXUA 98.3 MHz) is an FM station owned by Ultrasonic Broadcasting System and operated by Mindanao Broadcasting Network. Its studios and transmitter are located along Ariosa St., Brgy. Balangasan, Pagadian.

References

External links
Energy FM Pagadian FB Page

Radio stations in Zamboanga del Sur
Radio stations established in 2015